Ischia is a town and comune on Ischia island in the Tyrrhenian Sea. 

Administratively it is part of the Metropolitan city of Naples, in the Campania region in southern Italy. 

It is famed for its thermal baths due to the volcanic nature of the island.

Overview

The main centre of the comune is divided between Ischia Porto and Ischia Ponte. The latter takes its name from a former wooden bridge (ponte) which, until the 18th century, connected it to the Aragonese Castle.

Twin towns
 Marino, Italy
 San Pedro, California, United States
 Mar del Plata, Argentina

References

External links

Official Comune Ischia website—

.
Coastal towns in Campania
Cities and towns in Campania